The 2013 AON Open Challenger was a professional tennis tournament played on clay courts. It was the tenth edition of the tournament which was part of the 2013 ATP Challenger Tour. It took place in Genoa, Italy between 2 and 8 September 2013.

Singles main draw entrants

Seeds

 1 Rankings are as of August 26, 2013.

Other entrants
The following players received wildcards into the singles main draw:
  Gianluca Mager
  Andrey Kuznetsov
  Albert Montañés
  Francesco Picco

The following players received entry into the singles main draw as an alternate:
  Kristijan Mesaroš

The following players received entry from the qualifying draw:
  Enrico Burzi
  Janez Semrajc
  Carlos Gómez-Herrera
  Moritz Baumann

Champions

Singles

 Dustin Brown def.  Filippo Volandri 7–6(7–5), 6–3

Doubles

 Daniele Bracciali /  Oliver Marach def.  Marin Draganja /  Mate Pavić 6–3, 2–6, [11–9]

External links
Official Website

AON Open Challenger
AON Open Challenger
2013 in Italian tennis
September 2013 sports events in Italy
21st century in Genoa